The School of Art History and World Art Studies operates within the Faculty of Arts and Humanities department at the University of East Anglia in Norwich, England.

History

This institution was founded in 1964 as the School of Fine Arts and Music, providing courses in both art history and music. It was later renamed the School of Art History and Music, then the School of World Art Studies & Museology in 1992 to reflect a more cross-discipline approach to the study of art. The School took on its present name in 2013 and currently provides students with instruction and research opportunities in archaeology, anthropology, architecture, and museum studies in addition to art history.  Courses offered include medieval and Renaissance European art, contemporary art, ancient art, and African art. The School applies a global perspective to all coursework.

A 1978 gift of world art from the Sir Robert and Lady Lisa Sainsbury Collection enabled the School to relocate to purpose-built facilities in Norwich at the Sainsbury Centre for Visual Arts, designed by Sir Norman Foster.

Rankings
The School is ranked first for research (History of Art, Architecture and Design) in the 2008 Research Assessment Exercise of UK Universities, and achieved the joint highest student satisfaction rating for an art history department, according to the 2009 National Student Survey. The School is one of the top three Art History departments in the UK, according to The Times Good University Guide 2010.

Notable alumni

Paul Atterbury, antiques expert
Tim Bentinck, 12th Earl of Portland, actor and former Crossbench peer
Andrew Bolton, Curator in Chief of the Anna Wintour Costume Center
Alissandra Cummins, Director of the Barbados Museum & Historical Society
Robin Devereux, 19th Viscount Hereford, Director of Valuations at Bonhams
Tessa Jackson, Director of InIVA
Penny Johnson, Director of the Government Art Collection
Avril Joy, Costa Book Award winning author
Marcus Leaver, publishing executive
Jack Lohman, Director of the Royal British Columbia Museum
Philip Mould, art historian
Prince Jonathan Doria Pamphilj, of the Doria Pamphilj Gallery
Vicki Pepperdine, actress
Catherine Rabett, actress
Mark Stone, Sky News Europe Correspondent and Emmy Award winning journalist
Hassan Wario, Kenyan Cabinet Minister
Boris Wastiau, Director of the Musée d'ethnographie de Genève

Notable faculty

John Onians, architectural historian
Christina Riggs, historian of archaeology

References

External links

The School of Art History and World Art Studies, UEA
Sainsbury Research Unit for the Arts of Africa, Oceania & the Americas, UEA
Sainsbury Institute for the Study of Japanese Arts and Cultures

University of East Anglia